Thomas Hogarth (8 September 1815 – 1 September 1893) was a politician in the early days of the Colony of South Australia.

History
Thomas Hogarth was born in Dalry, Ayrshire, Scotland, and emigrated with his brother John to South Australia on the Delhi, arriving in December 1838. He was for a time farming at the Black Forest with William Bowman and with Robert Patterson. He worked at roadmaking and flour-milling, then the manufacture of agricultural implements (and much later was involved with John Ridley in improvements to his reaper). His brother John died a few months after arriving in Australia.

He ran Strangways Springs station with his son-in-law John Warren MLC, then around 1850 began farming on the Gawler Plains, near Smithfield, South Australia.

He was elected to the Legislative Council in 1866 and was reelected when his term elapsed in 1873, finally retiring in 1885 when his second 12-year term expired. 

He was a prominent supporter of the Gawler Agricultural Society and the Royal Agricultural Society and was appointed to the Diseases in Cereals Commission in 1867.

He died at his home, Blair Place, Smithfield.

Family
He married Jean Smith (ca.1820 –  2 February 1911); among their five sons and three daughters were:
John Hogarth (28 July 1844 – 5 January 1920) was manager of Strangways Springs for 26 years
Second son William (ca.1838 – 30 January 1912) married Belle Bowman (ca.1855 – 29 November 1892), daughter of William Bowman on 28 April 1881. He was manager of Elder, Smith and McCulloch's  Momba Station near Bourke, New South Wales.
Third son Thomas Hogarth (ca.1850 – 5 October 1929) managed Hogarth and Warren's Strangway Springs and Anna Creek stations. He could have been son of (deceased brother) John and Mary Blair Hogarth (died 5 December 1863).
David Hogarth (died 3 January 1910) helped manage Anna Creek station
Robert Hogarth married Alice Martha Grayson of Glenelg on 20 September 1894
Fifth son Alexander (ca.1856 – 2 March 1864)
Eldest daughter Margaret Hogarth married John Warren jnr. on 11 December 1863
Third daughter Jean (died ca.17 March 1896)

References 

Members of the South Australian Legislative Council
Australian pastoralists
1815 births
1893 deaths
19th-century Australian politicians
19th-century Australian businesspeople